Thando Bula (born 7 January 1981) is a South African first class cricketer. He was included in the Easterns cricket team squad for the 2015 Africa T20 Cup.

References

External links
 

1981 births
Living people
People from Enoch Mgijima Local Municipality
South African cricketers
Easterns cricketers
Wicket-keepers